Grennan Hill is the site of an Iron Age hill fort outside Penpont in Dumfries and Galloway, Scotland.

References
Schedule

Hill forts in Scotland
History of Dumfries and Galloway
Archaeological sites in Dumfries and Galloway
Scheduled monuments in Scotland